The  Vaddukoddai Resolution was adopted on 14 May 1976 in Pannakam near Vaddukoddai, Northern Province, Sri Lanka. It called for the creation of an independent Tamil Eelam by the Tamil United Liberation Front under the leadership of S. J. V. Chelvanayakam.It was the first time the demand for a separate state was made prior to this Tamils only demanded devolution or power sharing  . TULF contested the 1977 Sri Lankan parliamentary election on its demand for Tamil Eelam and won an overwhelming mandate in the Tamil areas, becoming the main opposition party in Sri Lanka, the only time a minority party has done so. It gave impetus to Tamil Nationalists who claimed it was a democratic endorsement of a separate state.

Background 
The adoption of the 1972 Sri Lankan which made a Sri Lanka a unitary state with Sinhala being the sole official language and Buddhism becoming the state religion. Federal Party led by S. J. V. Chelvanayakam wanted a Federal state with Tamil being an official language. Earlier accords signed including Bandaranaike-Chelvanayakam Pact and the Dudley-Chelvanayakam pact were not implemented by the Sri Lankan Government.

Aftermath 
The Tamil United Liberation Front demand for Tamil Eelam led the Sri Lankan Government to pass the 6th Amendment, which made it mandatory for all members of parliament to take an oath for the unitary state of Sri Lanka. The Tamil United Liberation Front resigned and refused to take the oath at a time when Tamil militancy was on the rise. Tamil Separatists led by LTTE took over leadership of the Tamils during the course of the Sri Lankan Civil War.

References

External links
Vaddukoddai Resolution

1976 documents
1976 in Sri Lanka
Origins of the Sri Lankan Civil War
Sri Lankan Tamil history
Sri Lankan Tamil politics
Sri Lankan Tamil nationalism